was a Japanese actor and voice actor from Tokyo Prefecture who was affiliated with Aoni Production and Production Baobab. He voiced Doraemon in the first half of the original 1973 Doraemon series. He voiced Shunsaku Ban, also known as Mustachio (Higeoyaji) or Daddy Walrus, a character appearing in many of Osamu Tezuka's productions. He was known for dubbing over Ernest Borgnine, Orson Welles, Charles Durning, Burt Young, Lee J. Cobb and many more. He also lent his voice to the Japanese dubbing of Mario (Bob Hoskins) in Super Mario Bros. He received an Achievement Award at the 3rd Seiyu Awards.

He died of a stroke on September 27, 2020, He was 84 years old.

Filmography

Anime

Video games

Overseas dubbing

Notes

References

 Book references

External links
 Official agency profile 
 

1936 births
2020 deaths
Aoni Production voice actors
Japanese male video game actors
Japanese male voice actors
Male voice actors from Tokyo
Production Baobab voice actors